The 2016 San Benedetto Tennis Cup is a professional tennis tournaments played on clay courts. It is the 12th edition of the tournament which is part of the 2016 ATP Challenger Tour, offering a total of €42,500+H in prize money. The event takes place in San Benedetto del Tronto, Italy, from 9 to 17 July 2016.

Singles entrants

Seeds 

 1 Rankings as of 27 June 2016.

Other entrants 
The following players received wildcards into the singles main draw:
  Gianluca Mager
  Andrea Basso
  Gianluigi Quinzi
  Edoardo Eremin

The following player gained entry into the singles main draw as a special exempt: 
  Stefano Napolitano

The following players received entry from the qualifying draw:
  Michael Linzer
  Laslo Đere
  Patricio Heras
  Kevin Krawietz

The following player entered as a lucky loser:
  Hernán Casanova

Doubles main draw entrants

Seeds

1 Rankings as of 27 June 2016.

Other entrants
The following pairs received wildcards into the doubles main draw:
 Andrea Basso /  Riccardo Bonadio
 Lucas Miedler /  Stefano Travaglia
 Federico Gaio /  Stefano Napolitano

Champions

Singles 

  Federico Gaio def.  Constant Lestienne, 6–2, 1–6, 6–3.

Doubles 

  Federico Gaio /  Stefano Napolitano def.  Facundo Argüello /  Sergio Galdós, 6–3, 6–4.

References 
 Singles
 Doubles

External links 
 Official website 

2016 ATP Challenger Tour
2016
2016 in Italian tennis